Sun Zhen is a Chinese-born professional field hockey player who participated in the 2006 Women's Hockey World Cup in Madrid, Spain playing for China.

References

Living people
Chinese female field hockey players
Year of birth missing (living people)
Place of birth missing (living people)
Asian Games medalists in field hockey